Tower of Power is an American R&B/soul/funk band from Oakland, California.

Tower of Power may also refer to:
Tower of Power (album), a 1973 album by the band Tower of Power 
The Tower of Power!, a 1969 album by jazz saxophonist, Dexter Gordon
Tower of Power (transmitter), a 236m tall radio and television transmitter tower built in the Philippines in 1988
"Tower of Power," an episode from the Teenage Mutant Ninja Turtles animated TV series
Superman: Tower of Power, a thrill ride located at two Six Flags amusement parks in the USA
 Tower of Power, an arcade game by Skee-Ball, Inc.
 Tower of Power, an S&M device alluded to in the Frank Zappa song "Bobby Brown Goes Down"
 Tower of Power, nickname for a display of three tabs of the United States Army

See also
 Power tower (disambiguation)